Abdur Rauf Khan (27 January 1939 – 2 May 2021) was a Manikganj district politician and freedom fighter of Bangladesh who was a Member of Parliament for Manikganj-2 constituency.

Early and family life 
Abdur Rauf Khan was born on 27 January 1939 in Ghonapara village of Arua union in Shivalaya Upazila of Manikganj District. His father Abdul Majid Khan was the chairman of Arua Union Parishad, and his mother's name is Mahmuda Begum. His younger brother Rezaur Rahman Khan Janu is the chairman of Shibalaya Upazila Parishad and a freedom fighter. Another younger brother, Sultan Khan, was chairman of the Arua Union Parishad.

His wife, the late Monowara Sultana Khan, was a professor and freedom fighter, and their two sons, Atiyar Rahman Khan and Habibur Rahman Khan.

Career 
Abdur Rauf Khan was the Deputy Regional Commander in Sector Two during the War of Liberation. He was elected Member of Parliament from Manikganj-2 constituency as a candidate of Jatiya Party in the 4th Jatiya Sangsad elections of 1988.

He was defeated in the 7th Jatiya Sangsad elections on 12 June 1996 and 8th Jatiya Sangsad elections of 2001 as a candidate of Jatiya Party from Manikganj-2 constituency.

Death 
Abdur Rauf Khan died on 2 May 2021.

References 

1939 births
2021 deaths
People from Manikganj District
People of the Bangladesh Liberation War
Jatiya Party politicians
4th Jatiya Sangsad members